"Anyone for You (Tiger Lily)" is a song by British singer-songwriter George Ezra, released as the first single from Ezra's third studio album Gold Rush Kid on 28 January 2022. It debuted at number 32 on the UK Singles Chart on 4 February and rose to number 30 the following week, eventually peaking at number 12.

Background and release
"Anyone for You" tells the story of Tiger Lilly, a 21-year-old girl who just moved to the city. Ezra sings as the protagonist of the song, who tells Tiger Lilly that he can be anyone for her and will help her as her romantic partner. The song also discusses what seems to be a breakup between the two main subjects and the protagonist's hope that Tiger Lilly won't forget him.

"Anyone for You (Tiger Lily)" was released on 28 January 2022.

Track listings

Charts

Weekly charts

Year-end charts

Certifications

Release history

References

2022 singles
2022 songs
Columbia Records singles
George Ezra songs
Songs written by George Ezra